Labar or LaBar is a surname. Notable people with this surname include:

 Boris Labar (born 1947), Croatian haematologist
 Daniel E. LaBar (1857–1939), American politician
 Jeff LaBar (1963–2021), American guitarist
 Ronan Labar (born 1989), French badminton player